The 1988 season of the Paraguayan Primera División, the top category of Paraguayan football, was played by 12 teams. The national champions were Olimpia.

Results

First stage

 Bonus Points: Sol de América 2.5, Cerro Porteño 1.5, Sportivo Luqueño 0.5

Second stage

 Bonus Points: Olimpia 2.5, Libertad 1.5, Cerro Porteño 0.5

Third stage

 Bonus Points: Olimpia 2.5, Sol de América 1.5, Cerro Porteño 0.5

Final Stage

Copa Libertadores play-off

External links
Paraguay 1988 season at RSSSF

Para
Paraguayan Primera División seasons
1